Agent 327 is a Dutch action/comedy comic series by cartoonist Martin Lodewijk. It was a regular feature from 1966 until 1983, and again from 2000 to the present. The eponymous Agent 327 is a James Bond/Maxwell Smart-like Dutch secret agent who fights for "Righteousness and World Peace"; his looks are based on the character of Peter Gunn. Often partnered with the junoesque Olga Lawina (an agent of the Swiss Secret Service), his adventures take him around Europe and the rest of the world as he battles numerous villains, both fictional and parodies of real people.

The song "Denk toch altijd met liefd' aan je moeder" by Gerda en Herman Timmerhout is a common feature in the comic, and is often used to hideously torture someone or provide a plot-turning emotional reaction.

Publication history 
Agent 327 debuted in 1966 as a feature in Pep magazine #21, written and drawn by Martin Lodewijk  and published by Geïllustreerde Pers. Agent 327 ran in Pep as a weekly 4-8-page feature until 1975, when Pep and the comics magazine Sjors merged into Eppo, published by Oberon.

Meanwhile, in 1970 Geïllustreerde Pers published the first Agent 327 album, titled Dossier Stemkwadrater. Further albums followed every few years, continuing under Oberon after Pep'''s acquisition.Agent 327 was cancelled as a feature in Eppo in 1983, but returned in 2000 as a regular feature. In 2009, Agent 327 returned to Eppo as a regular feature.

Characters

Main characters
Agent 327 Initiated into the world of espionage in the Dutch resistance, his creative and elaborate disguises just to get to work in the morning form a running gag and catchphrase: Grrrutjes-nog-aan-toe, wat een geheim agent toch allemaal niet moet doen om incognito op zijn werk te verschijnen (translation:"Heavens above, what a secret agent has to do these days to arrive at his job without being recognized.). Agent 327's real name, Hendrik IJzerbroot, is derived from the Dutch political figure Hendrik Koekoek and an allusion to the Dutch resistance fighter Bernardus IJzerdraat. The character's physical features were modelled after actor Craig Stevens who played in Peter Gunn.

The Chief One of his main concerns is to keep the costs down.

Willemse The doorman. When Agent 327 wants to enter the premises they exchange pass words.

Miss Betsy The secretary of the office. Obviously modelled after Miss Moneypenny.

Olga Lawina A Swiss secret agent partnered with Agent 327 in a wide variety of adventures. Her good looks often present both an advantage and a liability.

Recurring villains
Boris Kloris Ruthless spy with paper white skin.

Dr. Maybe Brother of Dr. Yes and Dr. No. With his assistant Fi Doh, and sometimes Herr Dr. Vonvonderstein.

Colonel Bauer German officer who held many war secrets.

Minor (real life) characters
Martin Lodewijk Member of several jug bands. First appearing with the badly-received Endatteme Jugband, he now plays with Chickenfeed.

Jan Tromp Struggling painter who was drafted by Boris Kloris to forge Rembrandt's The Night Watch. After being exposed he confessed that he'd turned down an offer to draw a one-page family comic for a women's magazine.

 Adaptations 
 Albums 
1 Dossier Heksenkring & Dossier Onderwater (1975)
2 Dossier Zondagskind (1976)
3 Dossier Zevenslaper (1977)
4 Dossier Stemkwadrater (1970, 1979)
5 Dossier Leeuwenkuil (1973, 1979)
6 Dossier Dozijn Min Eén (1980)
7 Dossier Nachtwacht (1980)
8 Dossier Dozijn Min Twee (1981)
9 De gesel van Rotterdam (1981)
10 Drie avonturen (1982)
11 De ogen van Wu Manchu (1983)
12 De vergeten bom (2000)
13 Het pad van de schildpad (2001)
14 Cacoïne en commando's (2001)
15 De golem van Antwerpen (2002)
16 De wet van alles (2002)
17 Hotel New York (2002)
18 Het oor Van Gogh (2003)
19 De vlucht van vroeger (2005)
20 De Daddy Vinci-code (2015)
21 Drie avonturen (to be published)Dossier Minimum Bug (1999) (not an element of the official series)

 Other versions 
 Agent 327: Operation Barbershop 
On May 15, 2017, the Blender Foundation released a teaser trailer that was almost four minutes long, for an upcoming computer-animated feature film based on the comic. It stars 327 as he investigates a barbershop, battles his nemesis Boris, and learns the dangerous truth about the shop. The 3-minute film was released online as a proof of concept to attract funding for a feature-length adaptation.

 Tribute stories 
Between 2017 and 2019, Eppo pre-published twenty-one shorties drawn and scripted by others. They were released as two volumes.

 Translation 
The agent's name has been changed in several languages:
 Danish: Hans Harkhoost German: Otto Otto (O.O.) Eisenbrot Norwegian: Henrik Eisenbrot Spanish: Enrique Panférreo Swedish: Otto Otto Gärning''

References

Dutch comics characters
Comics characters introduced in 1966
Male characters in comics
Dutch comic strips
1966 comics debuts
Spy comics
James Bond parodies
Humor comics
Adventure comics
Satirical comics
Fictional secret agents and spies in comics
Fictional Dutch people
Comics set in the Netherlands